Xerocrassa homeyeri is a species of air-breathing land snail, a pulmonate gastropod mollusk in the family Geomitridae.

Distribution

This species is endemic to the Balearic island of Mallorca in Spain.

References

 Bank, R. A.; Neubert, E. (2017). Checklist of the land and freshwater Gastropoda of Europe. Last update: July 16th, 2017

External links
 Dohrn, H.; Heynemann, F. D. (1862). Zur Kenntnis der Molluskenfauna der Balearen. Malakozoologische Blätter. 9: 99-111

homeyeri
Molluscs of Europe
Endemic fauna of the Balearic Islands
Gastropods described in 1862